The Offbeat Of Avenues was the thirteenth album released by The Manhattan Transfer on August 13, 1991 by Columbia Records.

This album is the first of two albums for Columbia Records.  This album is also the first Manhattan Transfer album where the majority of the songs were either written or co-written by the members of the group.

Awards
This album yielded the group a Grammy Award, in the category of Best Contemporary Jazz Performance for the song "Sassy".  The lyrics for this song were written by Janis Siegel and Cheryl Bentyne; the music was composed by Janis Siegel and Bill Bodine.

Track listing

Personnel 
The Manhattan Transfer
 Cheryl Bentyne – vocals, vocal arrangements (1, 6)
 Tim Hauser – vocals, sandpaper blocks (5)
 Alan Paul – vocals, vocal arrangements (4, 10), music arrangements (10)
 Janis Siegel – vocals, vocal arrangements (2, 3, 7, 8), vocal adaptation (11)

Musicians and Arrangers
 Ian Prince – synthesizers (1, 5), programming (1, 5), music arrangements (1, 5), vocal arrangements (1)
 John Beasley – synthesizers (2)
 Bill Bodine – synthesizers (2), programming (2), bass (2), music arrangements (2)
 Jeff Lorber – synthesizers (2, 3), drum programming (2), programming (3), music arrangements (3)
 Les Pierce – synthesizers (4, 8), programming (4, 8), music arrangements (4, 8), vocal arrangements (4, 7)
 Gerald O'Brien – synthesizers (6), programming (6), music arrangements (6)
 Don Freeman – synthesizers (7), programming (7), music arrangements (7)
 Yaron Gershovsky – acoustic piano (8)
 Larry Williams – programming (9), saxophone (9), music arrangements (9), horn arrangements (9)
 Erik Hanson – additional programming (9)
 Mike Finnigan – Hammond organ (9)
 Chuck Jonkey – synthesizers (10), programming (10), sounds (10) sitar (10), ethnic percussion (10), music arrangements (10)
 Mark Isham – synthesizers (11), programming (11), trumpet (11), music arrangements (11)
 Jamie Glaser – guitar (1, 9)
 Herb Pederson – acoustic guitar (6)
 Alec Milstein – slap bass (2)
 Leland Sklar – bass (9)
 Alex Blake – bass (10)
 Harvie Swartz – bass (11)
 John Robinson – drums (2, 6)
 Grady Tate – drums (3)
 Jeff Porcaro – drums (9)
 Connie Kay – drums (11)
 Frank Colón – ethnic percussion (10)
 Richard Elliot – tenor saxophone (1, 3)
 Bob Sheppard – saxophone (2)
 Phil Christlieb – saxophone (2, 9)
 Kevin Harris – tenor saxophone (5)
 Roger Lewis – baritone saxophone (5)
 Charles Joseph – trombone (5)
 Gary Grant – trumpet (2, 9)
 Jerry Hey – trumpet (2, 9), horn arrangements (2)
 Lew Soloff – trumpet solo (2)
 Gregory Davis – trumpet (5), horn arrangements (5)
 Kirk Joseph – sousaphone (5), tuba solo (5)
 Hector Vargas – quena (10), zamponia (10)
 Van Dyke Parks – vocal arrangements (5)
 David Pack – vocal arrangements (8)
 Mervyn Warren – vocal arrangements (9)
 Angelica Azero – narrator (10)

Production 
 Tim Hauser – producer 
 Ian Prince – producer (1, 5)
 Jeff Lorber – producer (3)
 Les Pierce – producer (4, 8)
 Gerald O'Brien – additional producer (6)
 Don Freeman – producer (7)
 John Cutcliffe – executive producer 
 Gary Lux – engineer, mixing 
 Leslie Ann Jones – second engineer
 Marnie Riley – second engineer
 Ted Blaisdell – additional engineer
 Stephen Krause – additional engineer
 Steve Miller – additional engineer
 Elliott Peters – additional engineer
 Ken Felton – assistant engineer
 Bernie Grundman – mastering
 Nancy Donald – art direction, design 
 D. Gorton – photography

Studios 
 Recorded at Conway Studios (Hollywood, California); Devonshire Sound Studios (North Hollywood, California); Studio 55 (Los Angeles, California); RPM Studios (New York City, New York); Paisley Park Studios (Minneapolis, Minnesota).
 Mixed at Conway Studios and Capitol Studios (Hollywood, California).
 Mastered at Bernie Grundman Mastering (Hollywood, California).

References / Sources
 The Manhattan Transfer Official Website

The Manhattan Transfer albums
1991 albums
Columbia Records albums